Airmail is a compilation album by Australian rock band Epicure.  It was released on 15 October 2001. The Album is essentially a collection of Epicure's previous three EPs repackaged into one album.

Track listing 
 "Nod & Smile"
 "I'm a Boy"
 "Animal"
 "By Ourselves, For Ourselves"
 "One of Us"
 "Hand Me Down"
 "Andy's Song"
 "Gentle like a Tidal Wave"
 "Momento Mori"
 "The System"
 "Clean Love"
 "A.Y.M"
 "Closure"

Notes 
 Produced by Cameron McKenzie and Epicure.
 Recorded and mixed by Cameron McKenzie at Station Place, Melbourne.

References 

2001 albums
Epicure (band) albums